Belus (Latin) or Belos (Bē̂los) was the indifferent classical rendering of the Semitic words bēlu and baʿal  ("lord") as a theonym, personal name, and royal title.

Belus may refer to:

In myth and legend
 Belus (Assyrian), the Babylonian Marduk as a legendary king of Assyria
 Belus (Babylonian) or Zeus Belos, alternate name of the Babylonian god Marduk
 Belus (Egyptian), the Canaanite Baʿal as a legendary king of Egypt
 Belus (Lydian), a legendary ancestor of Lydia's Heraclid dynasty
 Belus (Tyre), a legendary king of Tyre in Virgil's Aeneid
 Baal, a title meaning "lord" in Semitic languages spoken during antiquity; applied to gods
 Bel (god), in Mesopotamian mythology

Places
 Belus River, a river in Israel
 Bélus, a town in the Landes department of France

Other uses
 Beloš or Beluš, Regent of Hungary 1141–1146, Ban of Croatia 1142–1158, Grand Prince of Serbia 1162
 Belus (genus), a genus of weevils
 Belus (album), an album by Burzum
 , several ships the Swedish Navy
 Emperor Belos, primary antagonist of the 2020 American animated show The Owl House

See also
 EN (cuneiform), used to render the Akkadian bēlu
 En (cuneiform)
 Bel (disambiguation)
 Belu (disambiguation)
 Baal (disambiguation)